Milne Land or Milneland is a large island in eastern Greenland. It is the third largest island of Greenland, after the main island of Greenland and Disko Island. It is named after British admiral David Milne.

This island is popular among climbers.

Geography
It is part of an archipelago, which includes Storo and Sorte Island in the Northwest, Denmark Island in the south, and the Bjorne Islands in the northeast. Cape Leslie is Milneland's southeastern headland.

Image gallery

See also
List of islands of Greenland
Constable Point, the nearest airport.
Liverpool Land
Renland
Scoresby Sound

References

External links
 Peakbagger
  The spectacular east face of Grundtvigskirchen

Uninhabited islands of Greenland
Scoresby Sound